Sperm-associated antigen 11B is a protein that in humans is encoded by the SPAG11B gene.

Function 

This gene encodes several androgen-dependent, epididymis-specific secretory proteins. The specific functions of these proteins have not been determined, but they are thought to be involved in sperm maturation. Some of the isoforms contain regions of similarity to beta-defensins, a family of antimicrobial peptides. The gene is located on chromosome 8p23 near the defensin gene cluster. Alternative splicing of this gene results in seven transcript variants encoding different isoforms. Two different N-terminal and five different C-terminal protein sequences are encoded by the splice variants. Two additional variants have been described, but their full length sequences have not been determined.

References

Further reading